"Candyman" is a song by American singer Christina Aguilera from the second disc of her fifth studio album, Back to Basics (2006). "Candyman" was planned to be released as the second single from Back to Basics; however, RCA Records decided to release "Hurt" instead. Subsequently, the track was released on February 20, 2007, as the third single from the album. "Candyman" is described as a pop and jazz song that imitates swing music whose lyrics are about sex.

"Candyman" received praise for its musical style while some criticized its sexual content. Commercially, the single peaked within the top 10 in Australia, Canada, Hungary, New Zealand and Romania, as well as the top 20 in Austria, Belgium, Denmark, Germany, Ireland, the Netherlands, and the United Kingdom. In the United States, it peaked at number 25 on the Billboard Hot 100 chart and was certified Platinum by the Recording Industry Association of America for selling one million copies in the country. "Candyman" is also certified Gold in seven additional countries.

A music video for the song was co-directed by Aguilera and Matthew Rolston. The video received an MTV Video Music Award nomination for Best Direction at the 2007 award ceremony. The single achieved a Grammy Award nomination for Best Female Pop Vocal Performance at the 2008 ceremony. The song was on the setlist of Aguilera's Back to Basics Tour (2006–2008) and has been covered by Alexandra Burke and the Glee cast.

Music and lyrics

"Candyman" was described as a pop song by Leah Greenblatt from Entertainment Weekly; Stylus Magazine's Thomas Inskeep opined that it imitated swing music, while Joan Anderman from The Boston Globe commented that Perry and Aguilera attempted to modernize early 20th century pop and blues "only to end up imitating the Andrews Sisters," and Slant Magazine's Sal Cinquemani characterized the song as standard jazz and blues. "Candyman" is composed on the key of E major. The song has a moderate tempo of 172 beats per minute. Aguilera's vocals on the song span two octaves from the low-note of G3 to the high-note of G5. The song opens and concludes with the lyrics, "Tarzan and Jane were swingin' on a vine / Sippin' from a bottle of vodka double-wine", which was credited as a sample used from "Tarzan & Jane Swingin' on a Vine" from Run To Cadence With U.S. Marines. Lyrically, "Candyman" talks about sex; Jenny Eliscu for Rolling Stone quoted the lyrics "He's a one-stop shop / Makes the panties drop" and deemed it "nasty". Sputnikmusic's Amanda Murray described its lyrics as "dumb and cheekily vulgar".

Jim McMillen played the trombone, while Ray Herrmann and Glen Berger performed the saxophone, and Chris Tedesco played the trumpet. Perry also played the piano, mellotron, bass, and served as the musical director. Nathan Wetherington played the drums. According to Aguilera and Perry, the song was a tribute to the Andrews Sisters' song, "Boogie Woogie Bugle Boy".

Release
"Candyman" was planned to be released as the second single from Back to Basics in late 2006. In July 2006, Aguilera told Seventeen that "Candyman" would be released as the follow-up single to "Ain't No Other Man". However, RCA Records chose "Hurt" to be released as the second single off the album; therefore, "Candyman" was released as the third. The song was sent to contemporary hit and urban contemporary radio stations in the United States on February 27, 2007. In Germany, the single was released for digital download on April 6, 2007. One day later, "Candyman" was released as a CD single in France and Germany. On April 10, the song was available as a CD in the United States. A digital EP was released via iTunes Stores in European countries consisting of Belgium, France, Germany, Spain, and Sweden. On the same day, the digital version of "Candyman" was released in France. It was also available as a maxi single there on September 1, 2007. In the United States, a remix EP was released digitally on May 1, 2007.

Critical reception
Billboard called the single "raunchy" and praised Aguilera's vocals, saying that "few popular vocalists could pull off such a laudable feat." Sputnikmusic's Amanda Murray deemed the song as "fun" and reminiscent of the Spice Girls' "The Lady Is a Vamp" from Spiceworld (1997). Sean Daly from Tampa Bay Times complimented Aguilera's vocals and its "X-rated lyrics". Pittsburgh Post-Gazettes Scott Mervis labelled it "the swingiest single since Brian Setzer jumped, jived and wailed," while Yahoo! Music critic Dan Gennoe called "Candyman" "a good-time 1940s big band romp", and Leah Greenblatt from Entertainment Weekly cited it as one of the few "pop-song highs" in Aguilera's career.

AllMusic's Stephen Thomas Erlewine selected "Candyman" as one of the two outstanding songs on the second disc of Back to Basics, alongside "Mercy on Me". Lucy Davis for BBC Music was negative towards the song, writing that it "successfully turns the volume and intensity down from 11 to somewhere like 5." Jenny Eliscu from Rolling Stone criticized "Candyman" as "a dead rip-off" of the Andrews Sisters' "Boogie Woogie Bugle Boy". A reviewer from The Guardian disapproved of the "awful creation" and wrote that "the jollier she sounds, the more terrifying it becomes." "Candyman" received a Grammy Award nomination for Best Female Pop Vocal Performance at the 2008 Grammy Awards.

Chart performance
In the United States, "Candyman" debuted at number 99 on the Billboard Hot 100 chart on January 20, 2007. It peaked at number 25 on the chart, becoming Aguilera's fourteenth top 40 single on the Hot 100. On the Pop Songs chart, the single peaked at number 23 and remained there for a total of seven weeks. "Candyman" also peaked at number 18 on the Hot Dance Club Songs chart and stayed there ten weeks. It has been certified platinum by the Recording Industry Association of America (RIAA) for selling more than 1,000,000 units in the United States. As of August 2014, Nielsen SoundScan has reported that "Candyman" has sold in the United States 1,153,000 copies. In Canada, the single peaked at number nine on the Canadian Hot 100 and was certified gold.

In the United Kingdom, "Candyman" peaked at number 17 on the UK Singles Chart and remained within the top 75 for 20 weeks. Throughout Europe, the single attained the top 25 of most countries, peaking at number 11 in Belgium (Flanders) and Switzerland; number 12 in Denmark, Germany, Ireland and the Netherlands; number 13 in Belgium (Wallonia); number 14 in Austria; and number 24 in Sweden. In Denmark, the single achieved gold certification by IFPI Denmark. "Candyman" was a commercial hit in Oceania. The single peaked at number two in both Australia and New Zealand. In Australia, the song remained in the top ten for 15 weeks and earned platinum certification by the Australian Recording Industry Association (ARIA). In New Zealand, the single also achieved gold certification by the Recording Industry Association of New Zealand (RIANZ).

Music video

The music video for "Candyman" was filmed on January 28, 2007, in an airport hangar in Southern California. It was co-directed by Aguilera and Matthew Rolston. The video is based on the 1940s World War II theme. In most of the music video, she dances and sings in three different hair colors: red, blonde and brown, as if she were in a singing trio, a tribute to The Andrews Sisters. In other shots she appears as the famous biceps-flexing factory worker from Westinghouse's "We Can Do It!" poster and as pin-up girls Judy Garland, Betty Grable and Rita Hayworth. The video also features product placement for Campari. Benji Schwimmer, 2006 winner of the American dancing competition So You Think You Can Dance, makes a cameo appearance as Aguilera's GI dance partner. Benji's sister Lacey Schwimmer also appears in the video as a jitterbugger. Aguilera asked Rolston to co-direct the video with her after he worked with her for a photo shoot for the cover of Rolling Stone. Shooting the sequences of Aguilera as a singing trio took the longest since they had to be shot for each hair color and camera angle, which was computer-controlled for precision. Choreography was carefully arranged so that none of the versions overlapped and the takes could be spliced together. The clip's color scheme is based on Technicolor films, focusing on primary colors and bright secondary colors.

Sal Cinquemani for Slant Magazine praised it as the best video for a song from Back to Basics. John Montgomery for MTV News commented on Aguilera's "bad girl" image, writing "though Aguilera's mostly going for glam here, she's also plenty bad, too, swinging her way into some servicemen's heart, coyly sipping on a milkshake and shaking it so hard your even your grandpa had to notice." The video brought Aguilera and Rolston an MTV Video Music Award nomination for Best Direction at the 2007 MTV Video Music Awards, but lost to Justin Timberlake's "What Goes Around... Comes Around".

Live performances and covers

Aguilera first performed "Candyman" during a concert held in front of 1,500 fans and invited guests in London on July 20, 2006. The 40-minute concert comprised songs from the then-upcoming Back to Basics and other songs, including "Lady Marmalade" (2001) and "Beautiful" (2002). MTV UK wrote, "The gig reflected the jazz club mood of Christina's new album, with a swinging brass-heavy backing band and fit dancers bounding sexily around the stage". On September 8, 2006, Aguilera performed "Candyman" at Fashion Rocks in a white sailor suit with cap. The performance included photos of jazz standard artists that appeared on the backdrop. She also performed "Candyman" on Dick Clark's New Year's Rockin' Eve on December 31, 2006, and at the halftime show of the 2007 NBA All-Star Game. The song was included on the setlist of Aguilera's worldwide Back to Basics Tour. The recording of the performance was included on the video release Back to Basics: Live and Down Under (2008). Aguilera performed "Candyman" again on The Tonight Show with Jay Leno in 2013 in military-styled suits in efforts to honor the US troops.

It was also performed by Amber Riley (Mercedes Jones), Naya Rivera (Santana Lopez) and Heather Morris (Brittany Pierce) in "Pot o' Gold", an episode on the third season of the American TV series Glee. The version was well received by critics, some of whom deemed it as the best song of the episode. The Glee version peaked at number 158 on the UK Singles Chart on November 12, 2011.

Track listings and formatsDigital download "Candyman" – 3:14CD single "Candyman" – 3:14
 "Hurt" (Snowflake Mix) – 4:05France maxi single "Candyman" – 3:14
 "Hurt" (Snowflake Radio Mix) – 4:05 Digital download EP "Candyman" – 3:13
 "Candyman" (call-out hook) – 0:11Digital remix EP "Candyman" (Offer Nissim Club Mix) – 8:27
 "Candyman" (Ultimix Mixshow) – 4:23
 "Candyman" (RedOne Mix) – 3:19

Credits and personnel
Credits are adapted from the liner notes of Back to Basics.Sampling credits Contains a sample from "Tarzan & Jane Swingin' on a Vine" from Run To Cadence With U.S. Marines.Personnel'

 Christina Aguilera – vocals, background vocals, songwriting
 Jim McMillen – trombone
 Linda Perry – producing, songwriting, directing, piano, mellotron, bass
 Chris Tedesco – trumpet, horn contractor
 Ray Herrmann – saxophone
 Glen Berger – saxophone
 Nathan Wetherington – drums
 Marc Jameson – programming

Charts

Weekly charts

Year-end charts

Certifications and sales

Release history

References

External links
 

2006 songs
2007 singles
American jazz songs
Blues songs
Christina Aguilera songs
Music videos directed by Matthew Rolston
RCA Records singles
Songs written by Christina Aguilera
Songs written by Linda Perry
Vocal jazz songs